Ray Sanders may refer to:
 Ray Sanders (baseball)
 Ray Sanders (singer)